Phyllocnistis drimiphaga is a moth of the family Gracillariidae. It is known only from cloud forests above 2000 m in Cordillera de Talamanca and Central Conservation Area in Costa Rica.

The length of the forewings is 2.9-3.5 mm.

The larvae feed on Drimys granadensis.

External links
 Systematics, host plants, and life histories of three new Phyllocnistis species from the central highlands of Costa Rica (Lepidoptera, Gracillariidae, Phyllocnistinae)

Phyllocnistis
Endemic fauna of Costa Rica